Varahi River originate and flows through Western Ghats  in the Indian state of Karnataka. It is also known as Halady or Haladi river in downstream areas. It joins the Arabian sea after flowing through places like Halady, Basrur, Kundapura and Gangolli. It joins with the Souparnika River, Kedaka River, Chakra River, and Kubja River which are known by Panchagangavalli River and merges into the Arabian Sea. Pancha means five in Kannada and Samskrita and Ganga means river. According to mythology, Varaha is one of the incarnations of Lord Vishnu. Varahi is consort of Varaha.

Geography 
The river originates in the Western Ghats and flows into the Arabian sea. Many tributaries join Varahi at places such as Shettykoppa, Halige, Kollavadi, and Bangaragalli. The river joins the Arabian sea near Kundapura in the district of Udupi in Karnataka.

Kunchikal Falls
The major waterfall is in Hosanagara Taluk, Shimoga. The falls do not directly drop, but jump through rocks and boulders. After construction of the dam near Mani village for Varahi Hydro electric project, the water flow in these falls was greatly reduced. Now the falls operate only during the rainy seasons.

Varahi Hydro-electric Project
A hydroelectric dam, called Mani Dam (as it is constructed near Manibail village),
across the Varahi river. Power generation takes place underground. An underground power station built by KPCL uses water from this river near Hosangadi in Udupi district. The dam is near Yadur near Masthikatte, Shimoga District. Many villages got surrounded by water of this dam. Varahi lift irrigation project, using the waters of Varahi river is being constructed since 1979 near Siddapura village of Udupi district.

References

External links 
Varahi Hydro -electric project
Varahi 
Article in Hindu newspaper 
for photo of Kunchikal falls, taken from a distance at Hosangadi

Rivers of Karnataka
Geography of Shimoga district
Geography of Udupi district
Rivers of India